This is a list of urban areas in Sweden by population.

The population is measured by Statistics Sweden. The statistics bureau uses the term tätort (locality or urban area), which is defined as a continuous built-up area with a maximum distance of 200 m between residences. The localities are geographical and statistical units, totally independent of the administrative and political subdivision in counties and municipalities.

The urban areas in Sweden with more than 20,000 inhabitants as of 2015, according to Statistics Sweden, who only releases these statistics every five years, are:

See also
List of urban areas in Sweden
Largest metropolitan areas in the Nordic countries
List of metropolitan areas in Sweden
List of cities in Sweden
List of urban areas in Denmark by population
List of urban areas in Norway by population
List of urban areas in the Nordic countries
List of urban areas in Finland by population
List of cities and towns in Greenland

References

Urban areas in Sweden
Sweden
Sweden
Urb